Eudonia phaeoleuca is a species of nocturnal moth in the family Crambidae.

Subspecies
Eudonia phaeoleuca phaeoleuca  Zeller, 1846
Eudonia phaeoleuca fuscella (Turati, 1915) (Italy)
Eudonia phaeoleuca nevadensis (Zerny in Rebel & Zerny, 1927) (Spain)

Etymology
The species name derives fron the greek word φαιός, meaning grey, and refer to the color of the wings.

Distribution
This species can be found in Spain, France, Italy, Switzerland, Austria, Germany, Poland, Slovakia, on the Balkan Peninsula, in Turkey and in Russia.

Description
These rather inconspicuous moths are usually greyish-brownish. Their labial palps are elongated and project straightly, This species is very similar to Eudonia lacustrata (Panzer, 1804).

Biology
These moths are nocturnal. Adults fly from Zeller 1846July to September. They develop a complete metamorphosis which involves a pupal stage(holometabolous). It can be assumed that they feed on mosses, as in the most related species.

Bibliography
Rákosy, L., Goia, M. & Z. Kovács (2003): Catalogul Lepidopterelor României – Verzeichnis der Schmetterlinge Rumäniens: 1-447. Cluj-Napoca (Societatea lepidopterologică romană) [PDF auf lepidoptera.ro].
Erstbeschreibung: Zeller, P. C. (1846): Die Arten der Gattung Eudorea. — Linnaea Entomologica 1: 262-318 + tab. 2.

External links
 Lepinet
 Naturdata
 Invertebrados Insectarium Virtual

References 

Moths described in 1846
Eudonia
Moths of Europe